First TransPennine Express  was a British train operating company jointly owned by FirstGroup and Keolis which operated the TransPennine Express franchise. First TransPennine Express ran regular Express regional railway services between the major cities of Northern England as well as Scotland.

The franchise operated all its services to and through Manchester covering three main routes. The service provided rail links for major towns and cities such as Edinburgh, Glasgow, Liverpool, Sheffield, Hull, Leeds, York, Scarborough, Middlesbrough and Newcastle. Previously, all services called or terminated at Manchester Piccadilly, but, as of May 2014, a new service running between Newcastle and Liverpool Lime Street, calling at Manchester Victoria was announced, and launched as part of the Northern Hub plan.

When the franchise was re-tendered, FirstGroup and Keolis tendered separately. The franchise was awarded solely to FirstGroup, trading as TransPennine Express.

History

The TransPennine Express brand was launched in the early 1990s by British Rail, and maintained by the privatised operator Northern Spirit and its successor, Arriva Trains Northern.

In 2000, the Strategic Rail Authority announced that it planned to reorganise the North West Regional Railways and Regional Railways North East franchises operated by First North Western and Arriva Trains Northern. A TransPennine Express franchise would be created for the long-distance regional services, the remaining services being operated by a new Northern franchise.

In July 2003, the TransPennine Express franchise was awarded to a joint venture between FirstGroup and Keolis, and the services operated by Arriva Trains Northern and First North Western were transferred to First TransPennine Express on 1 February 2004.

The franchise was due to end on 31 January 2012, but in August 2011 the Department for Transport awarded First TransPennine Express an extension until March 2015. Included was a clause to allow the date to be brought forward to April 2014  to coincide with the end-date of the Northern Rail franchise. In March 2013 the Secretary of State for Transport announced the franchise would again be extended until 1 April 2016.

The continuation of the franchise was not certain. Local transport authorities and consultancies proposed merging Trans-Pennine services into other franchises to increase efficiency on the rail network. The Manchester Airport to Scotland service could be transferred to the InterCity West Coast franchise after the electrification of lines around Manchester by 2018. The south Trans-Pennine route between Manchester and Cleethorpes could be transferred to East Midlands Trains who operate an hourly service on the Manchester to Sheffield section.

In June 2014 the DfT confirmed two separate franchises in the north of England, one providing intercity rail services and a second providing local rail services. At the time proposals were made to transfer services including York to Scarborough and Doncaster to Cleethorpes services to the Northern franchise and transfer the Nottingham to Liverpool portion of the Norwich to Liverpool service operated by East Midlands Trains to the TransPennine franchise.

In August 2014, the Department for Transport announced FirstGroup, Keolis/Go-Ahead and Stagecoach had been shortlisted to bid for the next franchise. On 9 December 2015, FirstGroup was awarded the franchise in its own right with TransPennine Express taking over on 1 April 2016.

Services

North TransPennine

As a result of timetable changes in May 2014, five trains per hour instead of four operated on the core route between Manchester and Leeds on the Huddersfield Line. This was made up of the following services:

1tph between Liverpool Lime Street and  via Warrington Central and Manchester Piccadilly
This was also a 24-hour service.
1tph between Manchester Airport and Middlesbrough via Manchester Piccadilly
1tph between Manchester Piccadilly and Hull.

Most services between Manchester Airport and Newcastle ran early morning/late evenings.

In May 2014 an hourly service between Liverpool Lime Street and Newcastle Central was introduced. It ran non-stop between Liverpool and Manchester Victoria and onward to Newcastle via Leeds reducing journey times between Liverpool and Manchester by 15 minutes and Liverpool to Leeds by 25 minutes.

South TransPennine

TransPennine North West
TransPennine North West used sections of the Styal Line, Manchester to Preston Line, West Coast Main Line, Furness Line and Windermere Branch Line. These services were formerly operated by First North Western with the exception of the Scottish routes, which were previously operated by Virgin CrossCountry from Manchester Piccadilly.

Following timetable changes in May 2014 the following services operated:
1tph between Manchester Airport and Blackpool North. A number of peak services start or terminate at Preston.
1tph between Manchester Airport and Glasgow Central or Edinburgh Waverley (alternating). Most of these services used Class 350s (some Edinburgh services run in 8 car formations) however a number of peak services are still run by Class 185s via Bolton/Wigan North Western and Bolton/Chorley.

With the completion of the first stage of the North West electrification programme, the Scottish services were operated from 8 December 2013 by newly arrived Class 350 electric units and rerouted to stop at Wigan North Western after joining the West Coast Main Line close to Newton-le-Willows. Most stops at Bolton and Chorley were withdrawn as a result. With a number of peak services still operating via Bolton/Chorley or Bolton/Wigan North Western.

Performance
Official performance figures released by Network Rail for period 7 of the financial year 2013/14 were down on the same period last year at 87.8% (PPM) and MAA up to 12 October 2013 stood at 90.5%.

Rolling stock
First TransPennine Express inherited a fleet of two- and three-car Class 158 Express Sprinter trains from Arriva Trains Northern. It also operated Class 175 Coradias on hire from Arriva Trains Wales.

A franchise commitment was the replacement of the entire fleet, so in 2005 First TransPennine Express ordered 56 (later cut back by the Strategic Rail Authority to 51) three-car Class 185 Desiros, the first of which entered service in March 2006.

Most of the Class 185s were delivered in FirstGroup's neon blue livery. The "i" in the logo of Keolis is used as the "i" in the TransPennine Express logo in addition to the First "flying f" logo. The first eight units were delivered in First's dark blue livery, and later reliveried with neon blue vinyls.

The Class 185 trains proved popular with off-peak travellers, although these satisfaction levels decreased for passengers undertaking long-distance journeys and at peak times.

Despite the 185s having a higher capacity than two-car 158s, 185s frequently left passengers behind due to severe overcrowding at peak times. Transport for Greater Manchester stated in 2007 that projected passenger numbers would probably mean that  8-car units would be needed by 2014.

It was planned to operate all services with the new Class 185 Desiros. To solve this and create extra capacity, First TransPennine Express leased eight Class 170 Turbostars from late 2006 that were surplus to South West Trains' requirements, and in November 2007 a ninth was transferred from Central Trains. The Class 185 Desiros operated across the network, the Class 170 Turbostars on services from Manchester to Cleethorpes, Hull and York.

Since May 2014 services between Manchester and Scotland were operated by the Class 350/4s electric multiple units. This enabled the diesel trains in use on the Manchester to Scotland services to be transferred to other TransPennine Express services. The Manchester Airport to Blackpool route was also electrified, allowing further diesel trains to be cascaded on to other TransPennine Express services. However, this was after the end of the former TransPennine Express franchise.

In February 2012 the Department for Transport announced that 10 four-car electric Class 350 Desiros had been ordered to operate services from Manchester to Scotland via Wigan after electrification. It was confirmed that all the existing rolling stock would remain with the franchise to boost capacity.

However, in March 2014 it was announced that the nine Class 170 Turbostars would move to Chiltern Railways. MP Stephen Hammond revealed on 12 March 2014 that all the class 170/3s would remain with First TransPennine Express until the May 2015 timetable change.

In January 2015 it was confirmed Chiltern would take five of the Class 170s from May 2015 and the other four from February 2016. First TransPennine hired Class 156 Super Sprinters (which were originally intended to be used for extra capacity on Northern Rail services) from Northern Rail to work in pairs on the Manchester Airport-Blackpool North route, ahead of that route's transfer (along with the services to Barrow-in-Furness and Windermere) to the new Northern franchise in April 2016.

Fleet at end of franchise

Managed stations
First TransPennine Express managed the following 30 stations, many of which transferred to the new TransPennine Express franchise operator:

References

External links

|-

Defunct train operating companies
FirstGroup railway companies
Keolis
Railway companies established in 2004
Railway companies disestablished in 2016
2004 establishments in England
2016 disestablishments in England